Nashville is the forty-first studio album by American pop singer Andy Williams, released by Curb Records in 1991.  It's Williams's second album of country music, the first being You Lay So Easy on My Mind in 1974, and was reissued with a different track order under the title Best of Country on September 7, 1999.

Track listing 

"One Track Memory" (Charlie Black, Steve Bogard, Tommy Rocco) – 3:19
"Here and Now" (Mike Reid) – 3:03
"If I Had You" (Kerry Chater, Danny "Bear" Mayo) – 3:33
"After All This Time" (Rodney Crowell) – 4:23
 "Ship in a Bottle" (Dave Loggins) – 4:15
"Till Then" (Bob Regan, George Teren)  – 3:18
"Still Under the Weather" (Skip Ewing, L.E. White, Larry Michael White) – 3:02
"If I Had Only Known" (Craig Morris, Jana Stanfield) – 3:35
"If I Were You" (Randy Goodrum) – 4:25
"Last Chance" (Steve Bogard, Rick Giles) – 3:15

Song information

The two songs that Williams covers on the album that had already been chart hits for other artists both went to number one on the country chart in 1989. One of them, "If I Had You" by Alabama, was, in fact, knocked out of the number one spot by the other, Rodney Crowell's "After All This Time", in May of that year. Two other songs here have been covered by other artists. "If I Had Only Known" was also recorded by Reba McEntire in 1991 for her album For My Broken Heart, and "Still Under the Weather" was later recorded by Shania Twain for her self-titled debut album.

Personnel
Adapted from the AllMusic credits.
Andy Williams - vocals, background vocals
Larry Byrom - acoustic guitar
Mark Casstevens - banjo
Mike Lawler - synthesizer
Paul Leim - drums
Michael Rhodes - bass
Matt Rollings - piano
Dennis Wilson - background vocals
Bob Wray - bass
Curtis Young - background vocals
Reggie Young - electric guitar

Production
Milan Bogdan - editing, digital editing
Jimmy Bowen - producer
Bob Bullock - mixing assistant
Mark J. Coddington - engineer
Tim Kish - assistant engineer
Glenn Meadows - mastering
Paula Montondo - assistant engineer, mixing assistant
Ray Pillow - song selection assistance

References

Bibliography

Andy Williams albums
Curb Records albums
1991 albums
Albums produced by Jimmy Bowen